The Joint Photographic Experts Group (JPEG) is the joint committee between ISO/IEC JTC 1/SC 29 and ITU-T Study Group 16 that created and maintains the JPEG, JPEG 2000, JPEG XR, JPEG XT, JPEG XS, JPEG XL, and related digital image standards. It also has the responsibility for maintenance of the JBIG and JBIG2 standards that were developed by the former Joint Bi-level Image Experts Group.

Within ISO/IEC JTC 1, JPEG is Working Group 1 (WG 1) of Subcommittee 29 (SC 29) and has the formal title JPEG Coding of digital representations of images, where it is one of eight working groups in SC 29. In the ITU-T (formerly called the CCITT), its work falls in the domain of the ITU-T Visual Coding Experts Group (VCEG), which is Question 6 of Study Group 16. 

JPEG has typically held meetings three or four times annually in North America, Asia and Europe. The chairman of JPEG (termed its Convenor in ISO/IEC terminology) is Prof. Touradj Ebrahimi of École Polytechnique Fédérale de Lausanne, who previously had led JPEG 2000 development within the JPEG committee and also had a leading role in MPEG-4 standardization.

History 
In April 1983, ISO started to work to add photo quality graphics to text terminals. In the mid-1980s, both the CCITT (now ITU-T) and ISO had standardization groups for image coding: CCITT Study Group VIII (SG8) – Telematic Services and ISO TC97 SC2 WG8 – Coding of Audio and Picture Information. They were historically targeted on image communication. The JPEG committee was created in 1986 and the Joint (CCITT/ISO) Bi-level Image Group (JBIG) was created in 1988.

Former chairs of JPEG include Greg Wallace of Digital Equipment Corporation and Daniel Lee of Yahoo. Fumitaka Ono of Tokyo Polytechnic University was chair of the former JBIG group that has since been merged into JPEG.

Standards published and under development 

JPEG (Joint Photographic Experts Group) is Working Group 1 of ISO/IEC JTC 1/SC 29, entitled JPEG Coding of digital representations of images (working as a joint team with ITU-T SG 16). It has developed various standards, which have been published by ITU-T and/or ISO/IEC. The standards developed by the JPEG (and former JBIG) sub-groups are referred to as a joint development of ISO/IEC JTC 1/SC 29/WG 1 and ITU-T SG16. The JPEG standards typically consist of different Parts in ISO/IEC terminology. Each Part is a separate document that covers a certain aspect of a suite of standards that share a project number, and the Parts can be adopted separately as individual standards or used together. For the JPEG standards that are published jointly with ITU-T, each ISO/IEC Part corresponds to a separate ITU-T Recommendation (i.e., a separate standard). Once published, JPEG standards have also often been revised by later amendments and/or new editions e.g., to add optional extended capabilities or improve the editorial quality of the specifications. Standards developed and under development by JPEG are shown in the table below.

See also 
 Moving Picture Experts Group (MPEG)
 Joint Bi-level Image Experts Group (JBIG)

References

External links 
 

Joint Photographic Experts Group
Film and video technology
Organizations established in 1986
Coding of still pictures